Rudkhaneh-ye Kemal (also Romanized as Rūdkhāneh-ye Kemāl) is a village in the Sarduiyeh Rural District, of the Sarduiyeh District, in Jiroft County, Kerman Province, Iran. At the 2006 census, its population was 415, in 61 families.

References 

Populated places in Jiroft County